João de Sousa (11 July 1924 – 7 December 2014) was a Portuguese rower. He competed in the men's eight event at the 1948 Summer Olympics.

References

1924 births
2014 deaths
Portuguese male rowers
Olympic rowers of Portugal
Rowers at the 1948 Summer Olympics
Place of birth missing